The PostFinance-Arena (originally known as Eisstadion Allmend and Bern Arena) is an indoor arena in Bern, Switzerland. It is primarily used for ice hockey and is the home arena of SC Bern. It was opened in October 1967 and currently accommodates 17,031 people.

Construction 

A characteristic of the PostFinance Arena is that it has the world's largest standing room grandstand within an arena, with a capacity of 10,422 bench seats. The main roof comprises glulam arches, tied by steel tension members at their springing points. The maximum span of these arches is 85 metres.

History
The PostFinance Arena was the main arena for the 2009 IIHF World Championships, and had already hosted the inaugural Victoria Cup the previous year. Likewise, in May 2016, the 2016 European Women's Artistic Gymnastics Championships were held at the arena.

PostFinance Arena holds a Europe-wide attendance record, having a 16,203 spectator average in the 2008/2009 season.

Renovation
Due to its age and with an eye towards the 2009 IIHF World Championships, the arena was renovated. The holder invested about CHF 100 million (~$100 million) into the extension and restoration of the building. The modification was finished by April 24, 2009, when the World Championships started. The interior of the arena is mostly unchanged, especially the steep standing room stand, which is very popular with the fans. However the VIP-zone was entirely rebuilt and the capacity there was extended by about 500. The total capacity is now 17,031 spectators.

See also
 List of indoor arenas in Switzerland
 List of European ice hockey arenas

References

External links

  

Sports venues completed in 1967
Indoor arenas in Switzerland
Indoor ice hockey venues in Switzerland
Buildings and structures in Bern
Sports venues in the Canton of Bern
1967 establishments in Switzerland
20th-century architecture in Switzerland